An election of the delegation from Slovakia to the European Parliament was held in 2009.

The turnout, although increased compared to the previous election, was 19.63%, the lowest of any nation involved in the election.

Results

Division of seats
The system of dividing seats to the different lists is somewhat different in Slovakia, compared to some other countries. Firstly the election authorities count the total number of valid votes for parties who have gained more than 5% of the total. In this case there were 709004 such votes (85.75% of the total). This number is divided by 14 (13 seats plus one) to create the RVC (republic election number) or quota, in this case 50643 (6.13% of all valid votes cast). Parties are assigned one seat for the number of times they fill the quota. At this initial stage 5 seats were awarded to SMER, 2 to SDKU, 1 to SMK, 1 to KDH and 1 to HZDS leaving 3 seats still unfilled.

In Slovakia's system of proportional representation, the parties needing the fewest votes to get to their next quota are given the remaining seats. In this case those seats went to SMK, KDH and SNS. This is described in more detail at https://web.archive.org/web/20091119032933/http://www.volbysr.sk/volbyep2009/sr/tab4_en.html

In the D'Hondt method of proportional representation (as used for example in British Euro elections), the quota is progressively reduced until it reaches a number at which the correct number of candidates is elected. If this system had been applied in Slovakia, it would have resulted in the quota being reduced to 45960 (5.55% of the total), with the remaining 3 seats going to SDKU, SMK and SNS.

Awarding of seats to candidates
Each voter who voted for a party was also allowed to select two candidates from that party. The seats were awarded to candidates in order of the number of preference votes they received, provided that they received preferences from at least 10 percent of all the voters who chose the particular party.

Direction – Social Democracy (SMER)

Monika Flašíková – Beňová, Boris Zala and Vladimír Maňka were awarded seats they had the most personal preference votes and had received those votes from at least 10 percent of SMER's voters. The remaining seats were awarded on the basis of the party list ordering, the fourth seat going to Monika Smolková, (who was also coincidentally in fourth place in terms of personal preferences) and the fifth seat going to Katarína Neveďalová (who was actually tenth in order of personal preference votes).

Slovak Democratic and Christian Union – Democratic Party (SDKÚ-DS)

Eduard Kukan and Peter Šťastný were awarded seats they had the most personal preference votes and had received those votes from at least 10 percent of the SDKU's voters.

Party of the Hungarian Coalition (SMK)

Edit Bauer and Alajos Mészáros were awarded seats they had the most personal preference votes and had received those votes from at least 10 percent of the SMK's voters.

Christian Democratic Movement (KDH)

Anna Záborská and Miroslav Mikolášik were awarded seats they had the most personal preference votes and had received those votes from at least 10 percent of the KDH's voters.

People's Party – Movement for a Democratic Slovakia (ĽS-HZDS)

Sergej Kozlík was awarded the seat as he had the most personal preference votes and had received those votes from at least 10 percent of HZDS's voters.

Slovak National Party (SNS)

Jaroslav Paška was awarded the one SNS seat, as he had the most personal preference votes and had received those votes from at least 10 percent of the SNS's electors.

The overall effect of preference voting and the 10% rule

Of the 13 candidate elected, 11 were elected due to the number of personal preference votes they were given, and 2 were elected due to their positions on the party lists.

The 11 candidates elected due to personal preferences included 3 (KDH's Anna Záborská and Miroslav Mikolášik as well as SNS's Jaroslav Paška) whose list positions did not in themselves justify a seat so could be said to have been elected solely by preferential voting. The remaining 8 candidates (SMER's Boris Zala, Vladimír Maňka and Monika Flašíková – Beňová, the SDKU's Eduard Kukan and Peter Šťastný, the SMK's Edit Bauer and Alajos Mészáros as well as the HZDS's Sergej Kozlík) all would have been elected anyway if there was no preference voting in the system (as in some other member states) and the party list ordering had been used alone. It is important to note however, that these 8 people would not have been elected if their personal voters had chosen other candidates, so they were not in any way guaranteed seats as a result of their list positions.

The two candidates elected due to their positions on the party lists were from SMER. One (Monika Smolková) would also have been elected due to her personal preferences if the 10 percent rule had not been in operation but the other (Katarína Neveďalová) was elected solely as a result of her position on the party list.

See also

http://www.statistics.sk/volbyep2009/sr/tab3.jsp?lang=en

References

Slovakia
European Parliament elections in Slovakia
2009 in Slovakia